Blake Ellis may refer to:
 Blake Ellis (architect)
 Blake Ellis (tennis)